Livramento may refer to:

Places

Brazil
Livramento, Paraíba
Livramento de Nossa Senhora, Bahia
Nossa Senhora do Livramento, Mato Grosso, Brazil
Nossa Senhora do Livramento, Cape Verde
Santana do Livramento, Rio Grande do Sul

Portugal 
Livramento (Ponta Delgada), Azores

People

Sports
Tino Livramento